The 1884 United States presidential election in Massachusetts took place on November 4, 1884, as part of the 1884 United States presidential election. Voters chose 14 representatives, or electors to the Electoral College, who voted for president and vice president.

Massachusetts voted for the Republican nominee, James G. Blaine, over the Democratic nominee, Grover Cleveland. Blaine won the state by a margin of 8.03%. Greenback nominee and former Massachusetts governor Benjamin Butler won 8.04% of the vote.

Results

See also
 United States presidential elections in Massachusetts

References

Massachusetts
1884
1884 Massachusetts elections